Florian Luger (born 22 May 1994) is an Austrian male fashion model.

Life and work
Luger was discovered in 2012 at the finals of the Elite Model Look Contest in Austria which he won. In January of the following year Luger was on the catwalk of Milan Fashion Week for Emporio Armani and in Spring he walked for Bottega Veneta, Prada, and Gucci. He served as the opening face for Valentino menswear. He walked for Louis Vuitton, Dior Homme, and Kris Van Assche. He later also modeled for Fendi, the Spring/Summer 2014 campaign for Dior Homme, and a campaign for Tiberius. When asked about the trends in Paris that extremely slim male models were in demand, he replied tersely, "I would not go hungry for Paris." He has also walked for Moncler Gamme Bleu, Salvatore Ferragamo, Calvin Klein, Dolce & Gabbana, Burberry, Jimmy Choo, Topman, and other brands.

Luger completed compulsory military service and his studies at university, graduating in 2013. He is represented by the agencies View Management, Elite Paris, Elite London, Elite Milan, Elite Copenhagen, DNA Models, Stella Models, and Modelwerk.

Awards
 2012 Elite Model Look, winner of Austria finale
 2014 Vienna Fashion Award for best model

References

External links
 Interview with Florian Luger, blogfittingroom.blogspot.co.at, November 2013.
 , Florian Luger's instagram

1994 births
Living people
Models from Vienna
Place of birth missing (living people)
Austrian male models